Pyrgocythara laqueata, common name the tied mangelia, is a species of sea snail, a marine gastropod mollusk in the family Mangeliidae.

This is a taxon inquirendum.

Description
The few ribs of the shell are stout and remote. The sinus is not very distinct. The color of the shell is dull white.

Distribution
This species occurs off the West Indies.

References

External links
 Reeve L.A. (1846). Monograph of the genus Mangelia. In: Conchologia Iconica, vol. 3, pl. 1–8 and unpaginated text. L. Reeve & Co., London 
 
 

laqueata
Gastropods described in 1846